Iomeprol is a pharmaceutical drug used as a radiocontrast agent in X-ray imaging.
It is sold under the trade names Imeron and Iomeron.

It is classified as a water-soluble, nephrotrophic, low osmolar X-ray contrast medium. Low osmolar non-ionic agents are better tolerated and less likely to cause side effects than the high osmolar ionic agents.

The substance is not metabolized in the human body but excreted in unchanged form. It is decomposed slowly and can therefore accumulate in the environment.

See also
 Iodinated contrast

References

Radiocontrast agents
Iodoarenes
Benzamides
Acetanilides